Speech Technology is a magazine published four times a year by Information Today, Inc. The magazine discusses deployments, advances and other industry news in its magazine and on its website. Its headquarters is in Medford, New Jersey.

In addition, each year Speech Technology hosts the largest educational speech technology conference in the United States. SpeechTEK is attended by technology professionals from around the globe.

History
Speech Technology magazine was founded in 1995 at the first SpeechTEK developers conference in Boston, with the goal of reporting on the then-nascent speech industry.  It was purchased in 2006 by Information Today, Inc., a 29-year-old, Medford-based integrated media company specializing in magazines, periodicals, books, websites, and conferences serving the information marketplace.

Awards
In 2008, Speech Technology received an APEX award for publication excellence.

References

External links
 Official website

1995 establishments in New Jersey
Business magazines published in the United States
Quarterly magazines published in the United States
Magazines established in 1995
Magazines published in New Jersey
Professional and trade magazines